The Karachi Metropolitan Corporation (KMC) Building is a colonial-era building located on M. A. Jinnah Road, in central Karachi. Construction began in 1927, completed in 1930, and the building was then inaugurated in 1932. It is considered to be one of the most architecturally significant buildings in Karachi.

History 
A foundation stone for a new municipal office was first laid at the site in 1895. Groundwork for the new building was completed in 1915, but the remainder of construction did not begin until 1927. Construction was completed in 1930, and the building was inaugurated in 1932, as the Karachi Municipal Building. The total cost of the building was Rs.1,775,000. 

The building's Silver Jubilee Clock, a clock tower with a Moorish-style dome, was added in 1935 to commemorate King George V's visit to the region. 

In January 2007, Karachi celebrated the 75th Anniversary of the building. The building went through a major renovation project which included repairing of the clock tower.

On 31 August 2021, Karachi Administrator issued orders to fix historic British-era Silver Jubilee Clock on KMC building.

Architecture

Building 
Design of the building was devised by James S.C. Wynnes, a Scottish architect from Edinburgh. The building is mostly of an Anglo-Mughal style that blends native and colonial styles, but the building also contains Egyptian and Spanish motifs. Construction used Jodhpur sandstone for the facade, while local yellow Gizri sandstone was used to wrap the rest of the building.

Clock Tower 
The building's Silver Jubilee Clock and clock tower were added in 1935, and built with neo-Moorish and colonial motifs. The clock is surrounded by the words 'H M King George V, Silver Jubilee Clock 1935' along the outer perimeter of the clock.

Municipal functions 
The historic and iconic Karachi Metropolitan Corporation Building houses the mayor's and deputy mayor's office as well as the City Council (which has 304 members, all of whom are Union Committee Chairman). Due to increased number of members of Karachi's municipal government, and a shortage of space, the City Council passed a resolution for new City Council Building to be built in order to accommodate the required members on 3 October 2016.

Gallery

References

City and town halls in Pakistan
Government of Karachi
History of Sindh
Buildings and structures in Karachi
Government buildings with domes
Heritage sites in Karachi